Kharbovo is a rural locality (a village) in Porechenskoye Rural Settlement, Vashkinsky District, Vologda Oblast, Russia. The population was 12 as of 2002.

Geography 
Kharbovo is located 58 km northwest of Lipin Bor (the district's administrative centre) by road. Podgornaya is the nearest rural locality.

References 

Rural localities in Vashkinsky District